Cry1Ac protoxin is a crystal protein produced by the gram-positive bacterium, Bacillus thuringiensis (Bt) during sporulation. Cry1Ac is one of the delta endotoxins produced by this bacterium which act as insecticides. Because of this, the genes for these have been introduced into commercially important crops by genetic engineering (such as cotton and corn) in order to confer pest resistance on those plants.

Transgenic Bt cotton initially expressed a single Bt gene, which codes for Cry1Ac. Subsequently, Bt cotton has added other delta endotoxins. Products such as Bt cotton, Bt brinjal and genetically modified maize have received attention due to a number of issues, including genetically modified food controversies, and the Séralini affair.

Cry1Ac is also a mucosal adjuvant (an immune-response enhancer) for humans. It has been used in research to develop a vaccine against the amoeba Naegleria fowleri. This amoeba can invade and attack the human nervous system and brain, causing primary amoebic meningoencephalitis, which is nearly always fatal.

See also
 Genetically modified organism

References

Bacterial toxins